Fernelius is a lunar impact crater located in the southern highlands just to the north of the walled plain Stöfler. It was named after 16th century French astronomer Jean Fernel. The crater Kaiser is located next to the northwest rim of Fernelius. To the north-northwest are the craters Nonius and Walther. Southeast of Fernelius is the crater cluster of Miller, Nasireddin, Huggins, and Orontius.

In the past the floor of Fernelius has been resurfaced, leaving a relatively flat, featureless surface with no central peaks. The crater rim has been heavily worn and indented by impacts, the most prominent being Fernelius A which intrudes into the western rim.

Satellite craters

By convention these features are identified on lunar maps by placing the letter on the side of the crater midpoint that is closest to Fernelius.

References

 
 
 
 
 
 
 
 
 
 
 

Impact craters on the Moon